Frail as Breath is an independently released solo EP by Canadian electronic artist Mark Templeton. The album was re-released in connection with net label Robotopera in 2005.

Track listing
"Not Alone Anymore" – 4:13
"Continue Later" – 2:57
"Birds" – 1:16
"Drama Section" – 3:29
"Spring Breakup" – 3:00

Mark Templeton (electronic musician) albums
2005 EPs